Jan Thoresen (born 1 December 1968) is a Norwegian curler. He currently plays lead for Tormod Andreasen.

Thoresen played juniors for Anthon Grimsmo. He won a bronze medal at the 1987 World Junior Curling Championships playing second for Grimsmo.

Thoresen would then join up with Eigil Ramsfjell playing both third and second for him. As a third on the team, he won a bronze medal at the 1995 European Curling Championships and a bronze medal at the 1998 Winter Olympics.

By 2003, Thoresen would find himself playing lead for Thomas Ulsrud. He won a bronze medal at the 2006 World Men's Curling Championship with Ulsrud, Nergaard and Due.

Team mates up until 2007
Torger Nergård (third)
Thomas Due (second)
Jan Thoresen (lead)
Christoffer Svae (alternate)
Johan Hoestmaelingen(alternate)

Team mates 2007
 In 2007 Thomas Due and Jan Thoresen started a new team together with Tormod Andreasen and Kjell Berg. The team currently plays on the World Curling Tour Europe.
Tormod Andreasen (skip)
Thomas Due (third)
Kejll Berg (second)
Jan Thoresen (lead)

References

1968 births
Living people
Norwegian male curlers
Olympic curlers of Norway
Curlers at the 1998 Winter Olympics
Olympic bronze medalists for Norway
Olympic medalists in curling
Medalists at the 1998 Winter Olympics
21st-century Norwegian people
20th-century Norwegian people